Clarence Michael James Stanislaus Dennis (7 September 1876 – 22 June 1938), better known as C. J. Dennis,  was an Australian poet and journalist known for his best-selling verse novel The Songs of a Sentimental Bloke (1915). Alongside his contemporaries and occasional collaborators Henry Lawson and Banjo Paterson, Dennis helped popularise Australian slang in literature, earning him the title 'the laureate of the larrikin'.

When Dennis died, Australia's then Prime Minister Joseph Lyons said he was destined to be remembered as the 'Australian Robert Burns'.

Biography

C. J. Dennis was born in Auburn, South Australia. His father owned hotels in Auburn, and then later in Gladstone and Laura. His mother suffered ill health, so Clarrie (as he was known) was raised initially by his great-aunts, then went away to school, Christian Brothers College, Adelaide as a teenager.

At the age of 19 he was employed as a solicitor's clerk. It was while he was working in this job that, like banker's clerk Banjo Paterson before him, his first poem was published under the pseudonym "The Best of the Six". He later went on to publish in The Worker, under his own name, and as "Den", and in The Bulletin. His collected poetry was published by Angus & Robertson.

He joined the literary staff of The Critic in 1897, and after a spell doing odd jobs around Broken Hill, returned to The Critic,  serving for a time c. 1904 as editor, to be succeeded by Conrad Eitel. In 1906 he co-founded and edited The Gadfly as a literary magazine; it ceased publication in 1909. 

Dennis himself left The Gadfly and Adelaide for Melbourne in November 1907. In 1908, he camped with the artist Hal Waugh at Toolangi, north-east of Melbourne, near Healesville. Toolangi was his home for most of the rest of his life. C.J. Dennis married Margaret Herron in 1917. She published two novels and a biography of Dennis called Down the Years.

From 1922 he served as staff poet on the Melbourne Herald.

C. J. Dennis is buried in Box Hill Cemetery, Melbourne. The Box Hill Historical Society has attached a commemorative plaque to the gravestone.  Dennis is also commemorated with a plaque on Circular Quay in Sydney which forms part of the NSW Ministry for the Arts – Writers Walk series, and by a bust outside the town hall of the town of Laura.

Books 

 Backblock Ballads and Other Verses (1913) 

The Songs of a Sentimental Bloke (1915)
The Moods of Ginger Mick (1916)
The Glugs of Gosh (1917)
Doreen (1917)
Digger Smith (1918)
Backblock Ballads and Later Verses (1918)
Jim of the Hills (1919)
A Book for Kids (1921) (reissued as Roundabout, 1935)
Rose of Spadgers (1924)
The Singing Garden (1935)
The Ant Explorer (posthumously, 1988)

Poems 
 "The Austra-laise" (1908)
 "An Old Master" (1910)

See also

 Angus & Robertson
 C. J. Dennis Prize for Poetry

Further reading

References

External links 

 Australian Dictionary of Biography entry
 
 
 Works by C J Dennis at Project Gutenberg of Australia
 
 
Australian Authors – C. J. Dennis
Philip   " Your Vote is Wanted": C. J. Dennis at the Call''' JASAL'' 7 (2007)
Jack Thompson reads poems by C. J. Dennis

1876 births
1938 deaths
Australian humorists
Australian poets
People from Auburn, South Australia
People from Laura, South Australia

Australian film studio executives
Burials at Box Hill Cemetery
The Herald (Melbourne) people